Goose Lake is a lake in Clinton County, Iowa, in the United States.

Goose Lake was named from the many wild geese seen there by early settlers.

See also
List of lakes in Iowa

References

Lakes of Iowa
Bodies of water of Clinton County, Iowa